Soft Touch is the twenty-third studio album by American country music singer-songwriter Tammy Wynette. It was released on May 3, 1982, by Epic Records.

Commercial performance 
The album peaked at No. 31 on the Billboard Country Albums chart. The album's first single, "Another Chance", peaked at No. 8 on the Billboard Country Singles chart, and the second single, "You Still Get to Me in My Dreams", peaked at No. 16.

Track listing

Personnel
Adapted from the album liner notes.

George Binkley - strings
David Briggs - keyboard
Jerry Carrigan - drums, percussion
James Capps - acoustic guitar
Marvin Chantry - strings
Roy Christensen - strings
Virginia Christensen - strings
Jo Coulter - make-up
Connie Ellisor - strings
Phil Forrest - background vocals
Lloyd Green - steel guitar
Carl Gorodetzky - strings
Sherri Huffman - background vocals
Shane Keister - keyboard
Millie Kirkham - background vocals
Slick Lawson - photography
Mike Leech - bass
Rebecca Lynch - strings
Connie McCollister - background vocals
Ric McCollister - engineer
Charlie McCoy - harmonica, vibes
Dennis Molchan - strings
Weldon Myrick - steel guitar
George Richey - producer
Billy Sanford - lead guitar
Walter Schwede - strings
Lisa Silver - background vocals
Jan Smith - hairdresser, wardrobe
Henry Strzelecki - bass
Wendellyn Suits - background vocals
Robert Thompson - acoustic guitar
Diane Tidwell - background vocals
Gary Vanosdale - strings
Pete Wade - lead guitar
D. Bergen White - background vocals, string arrangements
Tommy Williams - fiddle
Stephanie Woolf - strings
Robert T. Wray, II - bass
Tammy Wynette - lead vocals

Chart positions

Album

Singles

References

1982 albums
Tammy Wynette albums
Epic Records albums
Albums produced by George Richey